Prince Nosrat al-Din Mirza Salar es-Saltaneh (February 2, 1884 – 1954) was a Qajar prince and painter, son of Nasser-al-Din Shah and princess Zinat es-Saltaneh grand-Daughter of Abbas Mirza. 

He was governor of Hamadan for a year in Mozzafar al-Din Shah's reign and after that he went to France. Nosrat al-Din Mirza was a companion to Mohammad Ali Shah when in 1923 he returned to Iran. For the second time, he went to France in 1926 and lived there until the death of Malakeh Jahan wife of Mohammad Ali Shah in 1945 in St. Clue and then came back to Iran. In Iran he lived in his sister Ezz es-Saltaneh's house. Nosrat al-Din Mirza died in 1954 in Paris and was buried there. He was a painter and earned living in Paris by selling his paintings. He also was a great setar player. Salar es-Saltaneh had 3 children, Sultan Hussein Mirza, Sultan Ali Mirza and Sultan Abdullah Mirza. Abdullah Mirza was born in 1912, died in Iran in 1957, and was buried in Zahir od-Dowleh cemetery.

References

 Moayer-ol-Mamalek, Dustali (1982). Rejal-e Asr-e Nassery.

Qajar princes
1884 births
1954 deaths